Gustavo Breda Rodrigues, sometimes known as just Breda (born May 2, 1986 in Linhares), is a Brazilian central defender.

He currently plays for Vasco after being promoted to the 1st team squad from the Under-20's for the 2007 season after signing 1st professional contract on 25 January 2006.

Breda made his 1st professional appearance for Vasco on 20 January 2007 in the 3-1 win over Portuguesa-RJ in the Rio State Championship.

External links
 Breda interview
 CBF
 sambafoot
 netvasco.com.br

1986 births
People from Linhares
Brazilian footballers
Association football defenders
Campeonato Brasileiro Série A players
Campeonato Brasileiro Série B players
CR Vasco da Gama players
Linhares Futebol Clube players
Rio Branco Atlético Clube players
Associação Desportiva Recreativa e Cultural Icasa players
Americano Futebol Clube players
Linhares Futebol Clube managers
Living people
Associação Jaguaré Esporte Clube players
Brazilian football managers
Sportspeople from Espírito Santo